Graham Ford Towers  (29 September 1897 – 4 December 1975) was the first Governor of the Bank of Canada from 1934 to 1954.

Biography 
Born in Montreal, Quebec, educated at St. Andrew's College in Toronto, he graduated from McGill University in 1919. During World War II, he was Chairman of the Foreign Exchange Control Board and Chairman of the National War Finance Committee. From 1944 to 1954, he was President of the Industrial Development Bank and from 1946 until 1954 he was alternate Governor for Canada at the International Monetary Fund. A longtime executive at the Royal Bank of Canada he was a strong proponent of the creation the Bank of Canada, Canada's Central Bank. He led the Bank of Canada for twenty years before he was succeeded by James Coyne. 

Towers was made a Companion of the Order of St Michael and St George in 1944. In 1969, he was made a Companion of the Order of Canada.

Mr Towers provided evidence for the Canadian Government's Standing Committee on Banking and Commerce, in 1939 and revealed much about the way banking works in Canada. In one exchange with Gerry McGeer he is quoted as saying "If parliament wants to change the form of operating the banking system, then certainly that is within the power of parliament" when asked "Will you tell me why a government with power to create money, should give that power away to a private monopoly, and then borrow that which parliament can create itself, back at interest, to the point of national bankruptcy?"

References

External links
 

1897 births
1975 deaths
People from Montreal
Anglophone Quebec people
Governors of the Bank of Canada
Companions of the Order of Canada
McGill University alumni
St. Andrew's College (Aurora) alumni
Canadian Companions of the Order of St Michael and St George